Anthony Cellier (born 1 June 1975) is a French politician representing La République En Marche! He was elected to the French National Assembly on 18 June 2017, representing the department of Gard.

See also
 2017 French legislative election

References

1975 births
Living people
Deputies of the 15th National Assembly of the French Fifth Republic
La République En Marche! politicians
People from Drôme
Politicians from Occitania (administrative region)